The Industrial Workers' Union NKV was a general union in the Netherlands, principally representing manufacturing workers.

The union was founded on 1 January 1972, when the Dutch Catholic Union of Employees in Metal, Electronics and Related Companies merged with the Dutch Catholic Mineworkers' Union, the Dutch Catholic Clothing and Textile Workers' Union, and the Dutch Catholic Factory Workers' Union.  Like all its predecessors, it affiliated to the Dutch Catholic Trade Union Federation.

By 1980, the union had 116,315 members, of whom, 50% worked in the metal industry, 15% in chemicals, 9% in textiles and clothing, 7% in food production, 5% in ceramics and glass, 4% in construction, 2% in paper and printing, 2% in personal services, 1% in mining and quarrying, and 5% in other areas of manufacturing.  The following year, it merged with the rival Industrial Workers' Union NVV, to form the Industrial Workers' Union.

Presidents
1972: Piet Brussel

References

Catholic trade unions
General unions
Trade unions established in 1972
Trade unions disestablished in 1980
Trade unions in the Netherlands